'Masbolono Thoba' Mor Dionysius Geevarghese (born 5 May 1948) is a Syriac Orthodox bishop, currently abbot of Piramadom Dayro.

Older posts
As Metropolitan
Assistant metropolitan of Simhasana churches
He was the Vicar of the 
 Arthat St. Mary's Simhasana Church at Kunnamkulam
 St. Ignatius Church at Erumely
 St. Simon Church at Velloor
 St. Mary's Church at Koruthodu

References

Syriac Orthodox Church bishops
Indian Oriental Orthodox Christians
1948 births
Living people
Christian clergy from Kottayam